Weaver & Devore Trading is a family-run, independent general store located in Yellowknife, Northwest Territories, Canada. It was established in 1936 by Harry Weaver and Ellis "Bud" Devore, fur traders and watercraft men from Peace River, Alberta. Their first trade run to Yellowknife Bay in 1936 was in response to the increased mining activity that summer. The following year, the partners had erected a permanent log-cabin trading post and business boomed as Yellowknife grew into an important commercial centre. While Bud Devore sold out in 1954, the business continued to operate under the name Weaver & Devore and has remained in the Weaver family since Harry's death in 1957. The store discontinued the fur trading business in the 1980s and now specializes in general merchandise, produce, bush orders, and outdoor clothing.

The store expanded into its current premises, on the other side of Weaver Drive, in the 1960s. The original Weaver & Devore trading post from 1937 is now a popular local restaurant called Bullock's Bistro and a City of Yellowknife Historical Site.

References

External links

 Weaver & Devore website

Retail companies established in 1936
Clothing retailers of Canada
Buildings and structures in Yellowknife
Buildings and structures in the Northwest Territories
Heritage sites in the Northwest Territories
Trading posts in Canada
1936 establishments in the Northwest Territories